Hylesia annulata is a moth of the family Saturniidae. It is found in French Guiana, Costa Rica and Ecuador.

References

Moths described in 1911
Hemileucinae